Ugo Nastrucci (born 14 December 1953 in Milan, Italy) is a lutenist, theorbist, and composer.

He studied composition with Irlando Danieli and Giacomo Manzoni at the Conservatorio "G.Verdi" in Milan. He studied lute with Massimo Lonardi, Paolo Chierici and Hopkinson Smith and conducting with Simone Fontanelli.

He was a founding member of many ensembles of Early Music, notably Ens. "Pian E Forte" and collaborated with such ensembles as "Il Conserto Vago", "Lo Scrigno d’Orfeo", "Europa Galante", "Ensemble Arte-Musica", "Capella Leopoldina", ’”Alessandro Stradella Consort", 'Ensemble “Zefiro”, “I Barocchisti” and "Accademia del Ricercare".

Compositions
He is the author of much incidental music for theatrical productions, orchestral, chamber and choral works, and serves as a professor of composition at the Istituto Superiore di Studi Musicali "Vittadini" in Pavia, Italy.

References

 Quadroframe record company biographical page, accessed 5 February 2010

External links
 , a curriculum vitae from the site of the Istituto Superiore di Studi Musicali "Franco Vittadini".

1953 births
Living people
Italian lutenists
Musicians from Milan
Musicians from Pavia
Italian performers of early music
Theorbists